Patricia Margaret Love (18 August 1947 – 17 February 2023) was a British actress. She had roles in the films That'll Be the Day, The Long Good Friday, and Mrs Henderson Presents.

Love died from complications of dementia on 17 February 2023, at the age of 75. She died at Denville Hall, a retirement home for entertainers, where she had been based since 2020.

References

External links
 

1947 births
2023 deaths
British actresses